Theh Kanjla  is a village in Kapurthala district of Punjab State, India. The village is administrated by a Sarpanch who is an elected representative of village as per the constitution of India and Panchayati raj (India).

Demography 
According to the report published by Census India in 2011, Theh Kanjla has 10 houses with the total population of 63 persons of which 36 are male and 27 females. Literacy rate of  Theh Kanjla is 62.71%, lower than the state average of 75.84%.  The population of children in the age group 0–6 years is 4 which is 6.35% of the total population.  Child sex ratio is approximately 333, lower than the state average of 846.

Population data

References

External links
 Kapurthala Villages List

Villages in Kapurthala district